The grand skink (Oligosoma grande) is an endangered species of large skink endemic to the central Otago region of New Zealand.

Physical characteristics 
Grand skinks are relatively large compared to other New Zealand skinks, capable of growing to lengths up to 11 inches (29 cm). They are marked with yellow-green speckling, which provides excellent camouflage in their rocky habitat of lichen-covered rocks and schist outcrops. Like most skinks, grand skinks are omnivores and feed on a wide variety of insects and fleshy fruits.

Habitat 
Grand skinks are only found in very specific locations in Otago, and are typically limited to the large schist rock outcroppings found in that region. They can often be seen sunning themselves on these rocks. As of 2000, the range of the grand skink has decreased by roughly 90%. Although it was once widespread, land use change, particularly the intensification of farming, and the introduction of mammalian predators has led to a decline in the population. The New Zealand Department of Conservation estimates that there are only 2,000 to 5,000 individual grand skinks remaining.

Conservation status 
As at the last reassessment in 2012, grand skinks have been classified as Nationally Endangered under the New Zealand Threat Classification System.

References 

  Listed as Vulnerable (VU C2a v2.3)
 The diet of grand skinks (Oligosoma grande) and Otago skinks (O. otagense) in Otago seral tussock grasslands. New Zealand journal of Zoology. 2003. Volume 30;pp 243–257.

External links 
 Video of Grand skinks from the New Zealand Department of Conservation
Image of a Grand skink

Oligosoma
Reptiles described in 1845
Reptiles of New Zealand
Endangered biota of New Zealand
Taxa named by John Edward Gray
Endemic fauna of New Zealand
Endemic reptiles of New Zealand